Robert James Moore (1844–?) was a teacher and Republican politician who served three terms in the Texas Legislature. He was born in Navasota, Texas in 1844. After the American Civil War, he became active in the Republican Party. He first served as a county commissioner, and was then elected to the 18th Legislature.  He took office in 1883, representing the 71st District, in Washington County.  He was re-elected twice. During the 1886 election cycle, Moore was jointly endorsed by the People's Party. In his first two terms, Moore lived in Brenham, and moved to Washington in his final term.

He was married and had three children.

See also
African-American officeholders during and following the Reconstruction era

References

Republican Party members of the Texas House of Representatives
19th-century American politicians
African-American politicians during the Reconstruction Era
1844 births
Texas postmasters
County commissioners in Texas
People from Washington-on-the-Brazos, Texas
People from Navasota, Texas
Schoolteachers from Texas
19th-century American educators
African-American schoolteachers
People from Brenham, Texas
Year of death missing